Irish people in Jamaica or Irish Jamaicans, are Jamaican citizens whose ancestors originated from Ireland. Irish people are the second-largest reported ethnic group in Jamaica, after Jamaicans of African ancestry. Most Jamaicans with Irish ancestry also have African ancestry.

Historical background
The first wave of Irish immigrants occurred in the early 17th century, Irish emigrant principally sailors, servants, and merchants. Many of the poorer emigrants were displaced Gaelic-Irish and Anglo-Irish Catholics, as well as convicts who were indentured servants. Many of the indentured servants were transported unwillingly. Of those surviving the long journey many more succumbed to disease, the harsh conditions and unfamiliar tropical conditions.   

One of the first English colonies in the Caribbean was established on Barbados in 1626. 

Irish merchant families from towns like Galway, Kinsale, and Waterford established their trading networks in the Caribbean.

First contact with Jamaica
Irish-forced transportees were first brought to Jamaica in large numbers  under the English republic of Oliver Cromwell following the capture of Jamaica from the Spanish in 1655 by William Penn and Robert Venables as part of Cromwell's strategic plan to dominate the Caribbean: the "Western Design". 

In 1655 Henry Cromwell, Major-General of the Parliamentary Army in Ireland arranged for the forced transplanting of 1,000 Irish girls and 1,000 Irish young men be sent to assist in the conquest and planting of Jamaica. 

In 1687 Christopher Monck, the 2nd Duke of Albemarle was appointed Lieutenant Governor of Jamaica by the Catholic King James II. His office was supported mainly by the Irish Catholic farmers and servants, an indication that the Irish were numerous, at least among the lower classes.

Later history
Migration to Jamaica continued through the 17th century, especially during the sugar boom on the sugar plantations of the West Indies, which forced many freed servants to look for land on the bigger islands like Jamaica. A Barbadian historian has estimated that of 10,000 Irish servants who left Barbados in the last quarter of the 17th century, at least half were destined for Jamaica, where land was available for small farmers. Also, it suited the British to have Irish settle near the internal frontier with the Maroons. From 1670 to 1700, Jamaica became the preferred destination for Irish and English servants departing the Atlantic ports at Kinsale, Cork, Galway and Bristol. By the late 17th century, some 10 percent of Jamaica's landowners were of Irish extraction and several, such as Teague Mackmarroe (Tadhg MacMorrough), who owned Irish indentured servants, attained the rank of "middling planter."

Later, in the mid-eighteenth century, Presbyterian colonial settlers who were fleeing Ireland arrived in the Caribbean. Scottish Gaelic speaking highlanders exiled after the Jacobite rebellions also came to the island in the 18th century.

In 1731, governor of Jamaica Robert Hunter said that the "servants and people of lower rank on the island chiefly consist of Irish Papists" who he said had "been pouring in upon us in such sholes as of late years". In the mid-18th century, Irish native names such as O'Hara and O'Connor were prominent, as well as Old English families like Talbot and Martin. Names present in 1837, recorded during the compensation hearings, include Walsh, O'Meally, O'Sullivan, Burke, Hennessy, Boyle, Tierney, Geoghagan, and Dillon.

Cultural influences
The Irish Gaelic language poet Eoghan Rua Ó Súilleabháin wrote his only English-language work in Port Royal, Jamaica while serving on a British naval vessel.

Notable Jamaicans of Irish descent
Sir Alexander Bustamante - national hero and first prime minister of Jamaica. 
John Edgar Colwell Hearne - novelist, journalist and teacher
Claude McKay - poet laureate
Clinton Morrison - football player for the Republic of Ireland national team
William O'Brien, 2nd Earl of Inchiquin
SPOT - rapper
Dillian Whyte - heavyweight boxer
Bromley Armstrong - black Canadian civil rights leader
 Kalvin Phillips

See also

Irish immigration to Saint Kitts and Nevis
Irish immigration to Barbados
Redlegs
List of expatriate Irish populations

Further reading
Thomas Povey's Diary, British Library, MS 12410, Folio 10
The Tide Between Us, by Olive Collins
To Hell or Barbados: The Ethnic Cleansing of Ireland, by Sean O’Callaghan, Brandon Press, IS N #9780863222870

References

Ethnic groups in Jamaica
European Jamaican
Irish Caribbean
Jamaica
+
Slavery in Jamaica
History of Jamaica